Pervushin is a Russian masculine surname, its feminine counterpart is Pervushina. It may refer to:
Denis Pervushin (born 1977), Russian football player
Fyodor Pervushin (born 1994), Russian football forward 
Irina Pervushina (born 1942), Russian artistic gymnast
Ivan Pervushin (1827–1900), Russian mathematician 
Pavel Pervushin (born 1947), Russian weightlifter
Sergei Pervushin (born 1970), Russian football player
Vladimir Pervushin (born 1986), Russian ice hockey forward 
Olesya Pervushina (born 2000), Russian junior tennis player

Russian-language surnames